Bematistes vestalis, the smoky bematistes, is a butterfly in the family Nymphalidae. It is found in Senegal, Guinea, Burkina Faso, Sierra Leone, Liberia, Ivory Coast, Ghana, Togo, Nigeria, Cameroon, Gabon, the Republic of the Congo, the Democratic Republic of the Congo and Tanzania.

Description
. 
P. vestalis is distinguished from all the other species by the transverse band on the upperside of the  forewing, otherwise so sharply conspicuous, being entirely absent or only in its posterior part (in cellules  l-2) distinct and light grey-yellow; cellule 1 a is nearly always yellowish to beyond the middle; the hindwing above is light brown-yellow at least to the middle, but beneath only yellow-brown at the base as far  as the apex of the cell. In the type-form vestalis Fldr. (58 e) the upperside of the fore wing is unicolorous  blackish to the base except for a yellow stripe at the hindmargin and the more or less distinct transverse band and the hindwing above has a black marginal band 7-9 mm. in breadth, sharply defined proximally, and beneath a usually very distinct whitish transverse band behind the basal part. Sierra Leone to the Niger. - In stavelia Suff. (59 a) the basal part of the forewing above is more or less broadly suffused with light yellow and the yellow basal area on the upperside of the hindwing is not sharply defined distally and sends out yellowish rays nearly to the distal margin; on the under surface of the hindwing the whitish median band is absent or indistinct. Cameroons to the Congo.

Subspecies
Bematistes vestalis vestalis (Senegal, Guinea, Burkina Faso, Sierra Leone, Liberia, Ivory Coast, Ghana, Togo, Nigeria)
Bematistes vestalis congoensis (Le Doux, 1937) (Democratic Republic of the Congo: Lualaba and Lushala), western Tanzania)
Bematistes vestalis stavelia (Suffert, 1904) (Cameroon, Gabon, Congo, Democratic Republic of the Congo: north-west to Mongala)

Biology
The habitat consists of lowland forests.

This species is mimicked by the striata morph of Pseudacraea eurytus.

The larvae feed on Adenia cisampelloides.

Taxonomy
See Pierre & Bernaud, 2014

References

External links

Die Gross-Schmetterlinge der Erde 13: Die Afrikanischen Tagfalter. Plate XIII 58 e
Die Gross-Schmetterlinge der Erde 13: Die Afrikanischen Tagfalter. Plate XIII 59 a stavelia
Images representing Acraea vestalis at Bold

Butterflies described in 1865
Acraeini
Butterflies of Africa
Taxa named by Baron Cajetan von Felder
Taxa named by Rudolf Felder